Jens Buss Barrios (born 24 January 1997) is a Chilean footballer who plays as a full back for Chilean Primera División side Deportes Antofagasta.

Career
After staying at several clubs during his youth in Chile, he went to Europe and took two failed tests in Dutch football clubs. Back in Chile, he joined Rodelindo Román, whose owner is Arturo Vidal, at the Tercera B. On 2019 season, he joined Chilean Primera División club Curicó Unido.

On 2021 season, he moved to Deportes Antofagasta on a deal for four years.

Personal life
Due to his father is German, he holds German citizenship. Also, he speaks German.

References

External links
 

1997 births
Living people
People from Santiago
People from Santiago Province, Chile
People from Santiago Metropolitan Region
Footballers from Santiago
Chilean people of German descent
Chilean footballers
Chilean Primera División players
Rodelindo Román footballers
Curicó Unido footballers
C.D. Antofagasta footballers
Association football defenders